William Henry Millar, born August 7, 1954, is the former president of the American Public Transportation Association.  From October 1, 1984 until October 31, 1996, he was the CEO of the Port Authority of Allegheny County, which serves the Pittsburgh metropolitan area.  In spring 1992, he dealt with a crippling 28-day work stoppage strike that was only resolved by the Pennsylvania Supreme Court, with an agreement not reached until eight months later.

References
 Public Transportation Leader Calls For New Mobility Solutions For Older Americans American Public Transportation Association, April 14, 2005

External links

1954 births
Living people
American business executives
Port Authority of Allegheny County executives
20th-century American businesspeople